The Wirth Building is a commercial building in downtown Duluth, Minnesota, United States.  When it was constructed in 1886 it was the city's first example of Richardsonian Romanesque style, and it stands as an early work of architect Oliver G. Traphagen.  The Wirth Building was listed on the National Register of Historic Places in 1991 for its local significance in the theme of architecture.  It was nominated for being a leading local example of its architectural style and a key turning point in the career of an important Duluth-based architect.

The building was commissioned by Max Wirth to house his pharmacy business.  Wirth's brother George happened to be one of Minnesota's best-known architects at the time, and had just forged a partnership with his star employee Traphagen.  Evidence is lacking to say which of the two partners might have been more responsible for the building, which was a stylistic departure for both.  Shortly after the building was completed, Wirth moved back to his native Bavaria while Traphagen remained in Duluth and became its premier architect.

See also
 National Register of Historic Places listings in St. Louis County, Minnesota

References

1886 establishments in Minnesota
Buildings and structures in Duluth, Minnesota
Commercial buildings completed in 1886
Commercial buildings on the National Register of Historic Places in Minnesota
Individually listed contributing properties to historic districts on the National Register in Minnesota
National Register of Historic Places in St. Louis County, Minnesota
Richardsonian Romanesque architecture in Minnesota